Mirrorball was a sitcom pilot in the United Kingdom directed by Adrian Edmondson and written by Jennifer Saunders. It originally aired on 22 December 2000.

All of the main cast members (and several supporting cast members) from the popular series Absolutely Fabulous were also cast in this show, although the plot and characters were completely different. It was produced as a pilot episode for what Saunders intended to be a new show. Mirrorball ended up inspiring Saunders to revive Absolutely Fabulous in 2001, and a full series was never produced.

Plot synopsis
The show centers around Vivienne Keill (Saunders) and Jackie Riviera (Joanna Lumley), two aging stage actresses who live in vertically adjacent flats. The two are of questionable talent, and their careers seem to be at a standstill. During the course of the pilot, Vivienne has the opportunity to be cast in a new show but delivers a horrifying rendition of the standard "Send in the Clowns", thanks in part to Jackie's off-kilter advice.

Julia Sawalha plays Freda Keill, Vivienne's younger sister and a more serious (and successful) actress. Jane Horrocks plays Yitta Hilberstam, a vicious Icelandic actress/waitress. June Whitfield appears as Dora Vermouth, a former vaudeville actress who spends most of her time intoxicated at the local pub and is showing slight signs of dementia. Harriet Thorpe plays Cat Rogers, an actress who is busy understudying multiple roles.

Cast

Main
 Jennifer Saunders as Vivienne Keill
 Joanna Lumley as Jackie Riviera
 Julia Sawalha as Freda Keill
 Jane Horrocks as Yitta Hilberstam
 Harriet Thorpe as Cat Rogers 
 Tim Wylton as Brice Michaels
 June Whitfield as Dora Vermouth

Guest
 Matthew Francis as Theatre Producer
 Sean Chapman as Mark 
 Alan Corser as Johnny
 Andy Clarkson as Postman
 Rupert Bates as Gordon
 Nigel Ellacott as Jackie's Fan 1
 Peter Robbins as Jackie's Fan 2
 George Hall as Pianist 
 Bonnie Langford as herself

Reception
The episode received a viewing figure of 6,690,000 and ranked 20th place during the week it was broadcast on BBC One.

Availability
Mirrorball is available as an "extra" on the DVD edition of Absolutely Fabulous series 4.

References

External links

Television pilots not picked up as a series
2000 television specials
Absolutely Fabulous